Ski Storsenter is a shopping mall located at Ski in Viken county, Norway. In 2002 it had a turnover of 1,186 billion Norwegian kroner. It opened in 1995, and has today 145 stores on three floors.  The builder and operator is the Olav Thon Group which is owned by the Olav Thon Foundation.

References

External links
 Official website

Buildings and structures in Viken
Shopping centres in Norway
Tourist attractions in Viken